Alexis Gonzalo Vallejos, known professionally as Midel, is an Argentine rapper and singer. His music is defined as Latin trap. He is known for being part of the Argentinian trap movement.

Career 
Midel started rapping at the age of 13 doing freestyles. He has collaborated with artist such as Seven Kayne, Lucho SSJ, Khea, Duki, and others.

On August 19, 2017, Midel releases his first song called B.U.H.O (with Arse, Khea, Duki, Klave, Mykka and Omar Varela), under the record label Mueva Records, the song currently has more than 78 million views on YouTube and 45 million on Spotify.

References 

Argentine rappers
Argentine trap musicians
Singers from Buenos Aires
Living people
21st-century Argentine singers
Year of birth missing (living people)